Beth Eden may refer to:

 Bit Adini, an Aramaean state that existed as an independent kingdom during the 10th and 9th Centuries BC
 Beth-Eden, a heritage-listed house in Graceville, Queensland, Australia